Bit Part is a 1975 Australian TV film directed by Eric Taylor and starring John Meillon, Vincent Ball, Noni Hazlehurst, Judy Nunn, Max Cullen, and Stuart Wagstaff. The plot is about a struggling actor who is cast alongside Britain's most famous actor.

References

External links

Australian comedy television films
1978 television films
1978 films
1970s English-language films